"June Tolliver" House, also known as the June Tolliver House & Folk Art Center, is a historic home located at Big Stone Gap, Wise County, Virginia. It was built in 1890, and is a -story, three-bay Queen Anne-style brick dwelling. It has complex gable roof with projecting end bays.  It is recognized as the house in which June Morris, the prototype of June Tolliver, heroine of John Fox, Jr.'s The Trail of the Lonesome Pine boarded when she came to school in Big Stone Gap. The house is open as a museum.

It was listed on the National Register of Historic Places in 1973.

References

External links

The June Tolliver House & Folk Art Center

Historic house museums in Virginia
Houses on the National Register of Historic Places in Virginia
Queen Anne architecture in Virginia
Houses completed in 1890
Houses in Wise County, Virginia
National Register of Historic Places in Wise County, Virginia
Museums in Wise County, Virginia